Iveta Benešová and Barbora Záhlavová-Strýcová were the defending champions, but lost to Gisela Dulko and Flavia Pennetta in the first round.

Top Seeded Liezel Huber and Lisa Raymond won the tournament by defeating Gisela Dulko and Flavia Pennetta in the final, 7–6(7–4), 0–6, [10–6].

Seeds

Draw

Draw

References
 Main Draw

2011 Doubles
Toray Pan Pacific Open - Doubles
Doubles